Aphanocalyx microphyllus subsp. compactus is a tropical rainforest tree in the family Fabaceae. This subspecies is endemic to the western Guinean lowland forests of Ivory Coast, Liberia, and Sierra Leone. The nominal subspecies Aphanocalyx microphyllus subsp. microphyllus occurs in the rainforests of central Africa.

References

Detarioideae
Flora of Ivory Coast
Flora of Liberia
Flora of Sierra Leone
Vulnerable flora of Africa
Plant subspecies
Taxonomy articles created by Polbot